Dong Qiwu (Chinese: 董其武; Pinyin: Dǒng Qíwǔ; November 27, 1899 – March 3, 1989) was a general in the People's Liberation Army of China.

Dong was born in Hejin, Shanxi Province. He attended the military study group founded by Yan Xishan in 1919. He joined the army in 1924. He first was recruited in Liu Zhenghua's army, and later joined National People's Revolution Army, and participated in North Expedition. After that, he joined Fu Zuoyi's army. Since 918, he actively fought Japanese, and  such battles in the Great Wall, Bailingmiao established his reputation. He was promoted to lieutenant general and head of 102 division in 1937, and fought in Pingxingguan battle. In 1946, he became the governor and commander of Suiyuan Province, and later became vice commander of northwest military and political official bureau. On September 19, 1949, he announced peaceful liberation of Suiyuan Province. He participated in Korean War, and was the commander of 23 army group of Chinese People's Volunteer Army. He became head of 69 army of PLA in 1953.

He was a delegate to 1st-5th National People's Congress, and a member of standing committee of 4th and 5th NPC. A member of 1st, 3rd, 4th, 5th and 6th National Political Consultative Conference, and vice chairman of 5th and 6th NPCC. He served as a member of 1st-3rd National Defense Commission.

He was made a general in 1955.

He died on 3 March 1989 in Beijing.

His granddaughter is the mother of Yabshi Pan Rinzinwangmo.

See also
List of officers of the People's Liberation Army

1899 births
1989 deaths
People of the Northern Expedition
People's Liberation Army generals from Shanxi
Delegates to the 5th National People's Congress
Delegates to the 4th National People's Congress
Delegates to the 3rd National People's Congress
Delegates to the 2nd National People's Congress
Delegates to the 1st National People's Congress
Members of the 5th Chinese People's Political Consultative Conference
Members of the 4th Chinese People's Political Consultative Conference
Members of the 3rd Chinese People's Political Consultative Conference
Members of the 1st Chinese People's Political Consultative Conference
People's Republic of China politicians from Shanxi
Politicians from Yuncheng
National Revolutionary Army generals from Shanxi
Republic of China politicians from Shanxi
Chinese Communist Party politicians from Shanxi
Vice Chairpersons of the National Committee of the Chinese People's Political Consultative Conference